State Road 8 in the U.S. State of Indiana consists of two disconnected segments that were never connected.

Route description
No part of SR 8 in Indiana is included as a part of the National Highway System (NHS).  The NHS is a network of highways that are identified as being most important for the economy, mobility and defense of the nation.

Western segment
The western terminus of the western segment is at U.S. Route 231(US 231) and SR 2 in Hebron.  The highway goes due east leaving Hebron and heading toward Knox.  It passes through rural farmland, having a four-way stop at SR 49 in Kouts.  The route enters La Crosse having a four-way stop at US 421.  North of Knox it begins a concurrency with US 35; this ends in downtown Knox with SR 8 heading due east.  The road leaves Knox passing through the east side of town.  The eastern terminus of the western segment is at SR 17.

Eastern segment
The western terminus of the eastern segment begins at SR 9. The road heads east from Albion toward SR 3. On the way to SR 3 the highway passes through rural farmland.  The road begins a concurrency with SR 3 at a traffics light north of  Avilla; this ends at an intersection with SR 3 on the east side of Avilla.  The road then goes due east towards Auburn.  It has a four-way stop at SR 327 north of Garrett.  The route enters Auburn on the west side of town and has an interchange with Interstate 69(I-69).  The road now passes through commercial areas before entering downtown Auburn where it has an intersection with Old SR 427.  The roadway now leaves Auburn, returning to rural farmland.  The highway has a short concurrency with SR 1.  The route turns southeast towards Hicksville, OH.  SR 8 ends at the Ohio state line; which then continues into the western terminus of Ohio State Route 18.

History

Western section
In the early 1940s, the road's western terminus was at the Illinois state line, becoming Exchange Street. It was truncated eastward to US 41 in St. John in the 1970s. From St. John to Hebron, it was concurrent to US 231. SR 8 was later truncated to its junction with US 231 in Hebron, eliminating the concurrency.

Central section
In 1951, SR 8 started in Lake Wawasee at SR 13 and continued east to US 33 south of Kimmell.  This section was deleted in 1971.

Major intersections

References

External links

008
Transportation in DeKalb County, Indiana
Transportation in Porter County, Indiana
Transportation in Lake County, Indiana
Transportation in Starke County, Indiana
Transportation in Marshall County, Indiana
Transportation in Noble County, Indiana